Sevar Point (‘Nos Sevar’ \'nos se-'var\) is a point on the south coast of Byers Peninsula on Livingston Island in the South Shetland Islands, Antarctica situated 1.9 km east-southeast of Devils Point, 2.71 km west of Nikopol Point, and 2.97 km northeast of Long Rock in Morton Strait.  It is surmounted by Wasp Hill on the north-northeast, Sealer Hill on the east-northeast, and forms the east side of the entrance to Raskuporis Cove.

The point is named after Khan Sevar of Bulgaria, 738-754 AD.

Location
British mapping in 1968, Spanish in 1992 and Bulgarian in 2009.

Maps
 Península Byers, Isla Livingston. Mapa topográfico a escala 1:25000. Madrid: Servicio Geográfico del Ejército, 1992.
 L.L. Ivanov et al. Antarctica: Livingston Island and Greenwich Island, South Shetland Islands. Scale 1:100000 topographic map. Sofia: Antarctic Place-names Commission of Bulgaria, 2005.
 L.L. Ivanov. Antarctica: Livingston Island and Greenwich, Robert, Snow and Smith Islands. Scale 1:120000 topographic map. Troyan: Manfred Wörner Foundation, 2010.  (First edition 2009. )
 Antarctic Digital Database (ADD). Scale 1:250000 topographic map of Antarctica. Scientific Committee on Antarctic Research (SCAR). Since 1993, regularly updated.
 L.L. Ivanov. Antarctica: Livingston Island and Smith Island. Scale 1:100000 topographic map. Manfred Wörner Foundation, 2017.

References
 Sevar Point. SCAR Composite Gazetteer of Antarctica
 Bulgarian Antarctic Gazetteer. Antarctic Place-names Commission. (details in Bulgarian, basic data in English)

External links
 Sevar Point. Copernix satellite image

Headlands of Livingston Island
Bulgaria and the Antarctic